Tortuga Island (Turtle Island) is a Caribbean island that forms part of Haiti, off the northwest coast of Hispaniola. It constitutes the commune of Île de la Tortue in the Port-de-Paix arrondissement of the Nord-Ouest department of Haiti.

In the 17th century, Tortuga was a major center and haven of Caribbean piracy. Its tourist industry and references in many works have made it one of the most recognized regions of Haiti.

History
The first Europeans to land on Tortuga were the Spanish in 1492 during the first voyage of Christopher Columbus into the New World. On December 6, 1492, three Spanish ships entered the Windward Passage that separates Cuba and Haiti. At sunrise, Columbus noticed an island whose contours emerged from the morning mist. Because the shape reminded him of a turtle's shell, he chose the name of Tortuga.

Tortuga was originally settled by a few Spanish colonists under the Captaincy General of Santo Domingo. In 1625, French and English colonists from Saint Kitts arrived on the island of Tortuga after initially planning to settle on mainland Hispaniola. The French and English settlers were attacked in 1629 by the Spanish commanded by Don Fadrique de Toledo, who fortified the island, and expelled the French and English. As most of the Spanish Army left for Hispaniola to root out French colonists there, the French returned in 1630 to occupy the fort and expanded the Spanish-built fortifications.

From 1630 onward, the island of Tortuga was divided into French and English colonies, allowing buccaneers to use the island as their main base of operations. In 1633, the first slaves were imported from Africa to aid in the plantations. However, by 1635 the use of slaves had ended. The slaves were said to be out of control on the island, while at the same time there had been continuous disagreements and fighting between French and English colonies.

In 1635, Spain recaptured Tortuga from the English and French, expelled them and left. As they soon returned, Spain conquered the English and French colonies for a second time, only to leave again because the island was too small to be of major importance. This allowed the return of both French and English pirates. In 1638, the Spanish returned for a third time to take the island and rid it of all French and the newly settled Dutch. They occupied the island, but were expelled by the French and Dutch colonists in 1640, at which time the French built Fort de Rocher in a natural harbour; the fort enabled the French to defeat a Spanish invasion force the following year.

By 1640, the buccaneers of Tortuga were calling themselves the Brethren of the Coast. The pirate population was mostly made up of French and Englishmen, along with a small number of Dutchmen. In 1654, the Spanish captured the island for the fourth and last time.

In 1655, Tortuga was reoccupied by English and French interlopers under Elias Watts, who secured a commission from Col. William Brayne, acting as military Governor on Jamaica, to serve as "Governor" of Tortuga. In 1660, England appointed a Frenchman Jeremie Dechamps as Governor who proclaimed suzerainty to the King of France, set up French colours, and defeated several English attempts to reclaim the island. In 1664, a French governor brought 400 French colonists for the island from his home province of Anjou, who established Hispaniola's first sugar plantations since the first wave of European colonization. This group of colonists spread to the coast of the mainland and became the nexus of the French colony of Saint-Domingue. 

By 1670, the buccaneer era was in decline, and many of the pirates turned to log cutting and wood trading as a new income source. At this time, a Welsh privateer named Henry Morgan started to promote himself and invited the pirates on the island of Tortuga to set sail under him. They were hired by the French as a striking force that allowed France to have a much stronger hold on the Caribbean region. Consequently, the pirates never really controlled the island and kept Tortuga as a neutral hideout for pirate booty.

In 1680, new Acts of Parliament forbade sailing under foreign flags (in opposition to former practice). This was a major legal blow to the Caribbean pirates. Settlements were made in the Treaty of Ratisbon of 1684, signed by the European powers, that put an end to piracy. Most of the pirates after this time were hired out into the Royal services to suppress their former buccaneer allies. The capital of Saint-Domingue was moved from Tortuga to Port-de-Paix on the mainland of Hispaniola in 1676.

Geography

The island of Tortuga stands off the northern coast of Haiti. It is very mountainous and rocky; the rocks are especially abundant on the northern part of the island. At the beginning of the 17th century, the population lived on the southern coast of the island, where there was a port for ships to enter. The northern shore was described as inaccessible via both land and sea.

The inhabited area was divided into four parts; the first of these was called "Low Land" or "Low Country". This region contained the island's port and was therefore considered the most important. The town was called Cayona, and the richest planters of the island lived there. The second region was called the "Middle Plantation"; the farmers of this region were unfamiliar with the soil and it was only used to grow tobacco. The third part was named "La Ringot", and was positioned on the western portion of the island. The fourth region was called the "La Montagne" (the Mountain); it is there that the first cultivated plantations were established upon the island.

This 17th century geography is known largely from Alexandre-Olivier Exquemelin's detailed description in his book Zeerovers, where he describes a 1666 journey to the island.

In popular culture
Tortuga has been portrayed in many works depicting piracy in the Caribbean in the 17th and 18th centuries.

Films
Tortuga has been featured in numerous films, including
Safe in Hell (1931)
Captain Blood (1935)
The Black Swan (1942)
The Spanish Main (1945)
Double Crossbones (1950)
Abbott and Costello Meet Captain Kidd (1952)
Pirates of Tortuga (1961)
 Pirates of the Caribbean films

Literature
Books featuring the island include:
 Deadmen Walking: A Deadman's Cross Novel (2017) by Sherrilyn Kenyon
 Tortuga by Valerio Evangelisti
 Caribbean (1989) by James Michener
 The Black Swan (1932) by Rafael Sabatini
 The Black Corsair series of novels by Emilio Salgari (1898-1908)
 The Black Avenger of the Spanish Main (1847) by Ned Buntline
 The Dark Secret of Josephine (1955) by Dennis Wheatley
 1637: No Peace Beyond the Line (November 2020) by Eric Flint and Charles E. Gannon

Music
Tortuga is mentioned in multiple songs, including:
 "Jonas Psalter" (1973) by the rock band Styx
 "Tortuga Bay" (1989) by German heavy metal band Running Wild
 "Tortuga" (2006) by Italian Ska band Talco
 "Jack Sparrow" by The Lonely Island featuring Michael Bolton
 "Tortuga" (2011) by Welsh band Catfish and the Bottlemen
 "Welcome to Tortuga" (2012) by Swedish Pirate Folk band Ye Banished Privateers
 "Tortuga" (2014) by the space rock band Earthling Society
 "Tortuga" (2020) and "Return to Tortuga" (2022) by the Scottish Pirate Metal Band Alestorm
 "Turtle Island" (2002) by Mike Oldfield

Rafael Sabatini's works

Captain Blood
Tortuga is featured in Rafael Sabatini's Captain Blood series and the movies based on it; the most famous is Captain Blood (1935) starring Errol Flynn. It is the place where Blood and his crew find refuge after their escape from Barbados in 1685. Blood receives a Letter of Marque from Tortuga's governor, D'Ogeron, and the island becomes his main base for the next four years. He starts his raids from Cayona, and several events in the books take place on Tortuga itself or on ships anchoring in the harbour of Cayona.

Sabatini used Exquemelin's History of the Bouccaneers of America as a main source for his description of Tortuga, and therefore the island is portrayed as a place where many buccaneers, prostitutes, and other dubious professions operate, but the French West India Company, which rules Tortuga, makes profit off of those affairs.

The Black Swan
Tortuga also features in Sabatini's novel The Black Swan and the 1942 movie based on it.

Notable people
Gabard Fénélon, professional football player
Hugues Gentillon, film director, and founder of Yugy Pictures Entertainment

See also

 List of islands of Haiti
 List of lighthouses in Haiti
 Geography of Pirates of the Caribbean
 Port Royal
 Tortuga (cocktail)

References

(2003) Pancorbo, Luis: "El Canal de la Tortuga" en "Río de América". pp. 321–333. Laertes, Barcelona.

External links

  "Method of Securing the Ports and Populations of All the Coasts of the Indies", from 1694, discusses Tortuga's history with piracy.

 
1625 establishments in the French colonial empire
Communes of Haiti
Geography of Hispaniola
History of Hispaniola
Islands of Haiti
Pirate dens and locations
Piracy in the Caribbean
Lighthouses in Haiti
Nord-Ouest (department)
Island countries